Aechmea ornata is a species of flowering plant in the Bromeliaceae family. It is endemic to southern Brazil from Rio de Janeiro State south to Santa Catarina.

References

ornata
Flora of Brazil
Plants described in 1843
Taxa named by John Gilbert Baker
Taxa named by Charles Gaudichaud-Beaupré